The 19th International Gold Cup was a non-championship Formula One race, which was held on the Oulton Park circuit, located near Tarporley, Cheshire, England on 29 May 1972.

Report

Entry

The race had been brought forward to the Bank Holiday weekend in the hope of attracting more entries. However, a competing Formula Two race at Crystal Palace took away some potential entrants. As a result, ten of the cars that had competed in the European Formula 5000 round earlier in the day joined the eight Formula One cars on the grid.

Although the race regularly attracted the top teams from across Britain and Europe, the increasing costs of F1 and more countries wishing to have their own Grand Prix, the Gold Cup fell by wayside with this being the last true F1 race.

Qualifying

Peter Gethin took pole position for the Marlboro BRM, in their BRM P160B, averaging a speed of 117.433 mph. Denny Hulme in a McLaren M19A was second fastest, just 0.2 of a second behind. The fastest of the F5000 cars was Alan Rollinson in fifth, in his Alan McKechnie Racing Lola-Chevrolet T300.

Race
The race was held over 40 laps of the Oulton Park circuit. Denny Hulme took the winner spoils for Yardley Team McLaren, driving their McLaren-Cosworth M19A. Hulme won in a time of 1hr 24.400mins., averaging a speed of 115.408 mph. The second car home was that of Emerson Fittipaldi, for the John Player Team Lotus in their Cosworth powered Lotus 72D. The podium was completed by Tim Schenken, in a Surtees-Cosworth TS9B for Team Surtees outfit albeit one lap adrift. The first F5000 car home was that of Brian Redman in a Sid Taylor Racing entered, Chevron-Chevrolet B24 in fourth.

Classification

References

International Gold Gup
International Gold Gup
International Gold Cup